#JustSaying is the first web series in the Balkans for teenagers about the relationships of a small group of young people from different countries. The series is broadcast online only – on the official YouTube channel, official Facebook page of the series and on the samokažem.org web site. Each webisode is subtitled in Serbian, Croatian, Bosnian, Macedonian, Albanian and English languages.

The first season was launched on November 7, 2013. It consist of 26 five minutes' webisodes that are distributed on Mondays and Thursdays at 10 pm. The series is produced by Fund B92. Tuna Fish Studio is the executive producer of the series.

Plot
The storyline follows events of an (un)usual summer in the life of a small number of girls and boys that gradually become true friends. They all come from different countries that share borders that their population members choose to cross only rarely and unwillingly. They speak different languages, but can excellently understand each other.

Characters
According to official website characters are described as following:

Jovana (17) is the youngest one in the gang. She is deeply convinced that she is quite maturer than her peers. Until now, she was an ordinary high school student from Belgrade, Serbia. But this summer, while her boyfriend is on a trip to Canada, her universe is about to change entirely.

Miloš (21) is a Belgrade bum. He spends hours watching YouTube, and is the author of some of videos there. The most important things in his life are good fun and surf. The rest is too demanding for anyone to take it seriously. This drives his younger sister Jovana up the wall.

Maja (19) is her daddy's little girl. She fled from Kotor, Montenegro, from her father and from the small community there, to live in Belgrade and be an independent woman. Her daddy still pays all her bills, rents a huge apartment in downtown Belgrade for her and regularly sends her a mind-bogglingly huge allowance.

Always in a good mode, smiling, laughing and optimistic, Aleksandra (19) is a true party girl. She dreams of becoming an actress, moving from Skoplje, Macedonia, to Hollywood, and especially of leaving her hand imprints on the Walk of Fame in a dashing dress!

If life gives you lemons, make a lemonade. Zoran (21) has not exactly been given any lemons, but has his father's taxi cab and his own ambition to buy a brand new iPhone. Prices of bear in Belgrade, Serbia, stand in the way of this achievement. And, in addition to this – he can't exactly tell where he belongs.

Dren (20) is the quiet character in this gang, mainly due to the fact that he can't speak their language. He followed his love and ventured out to a great adventure, and for the first time in his life, he came to the city that he heard nothing but the worst things about. True challenges lie ahead for him, along with some interesting revelations as well.

Milena (21) is a romantic, well-wishing soul. She moved from the little town of Kuršumlija to Belgrade, exchanging the safety of the small community and her parents’ home for the life in a big city that is not always cosy for its inhabitants. She works as a nurse, and is now for a couple of months volunteering in a hospital. Her preferences are those of the young people in general. She's into horoscopes.

Relaxed and always smiling, Marko (21) is the good genie of the gang. He lives in the small town of Bor, and loves traveling more than anything else in this world. He packs his things with the same passion for a trip to Lausanne, Switzerland and to Loznica, Serbia, as long as he is about to travel to a place. He works as an attendant in the renting booth for paddleboats on Srebrno Jezero to earn his pocket money.

Like many others, Zoran's father, Dušan (51), had to leave his birthplace during the wars in 1990s. He moved from Sarajevo to Belgrade and he changed many jobs to support his family – he worked as a dealer of various goods in the open market, as a night security guard, as a service engineer for household appliances... As soon as he saved enough money, he bought a car and started working as a taxi driver. He is divorced. He misses his son a great deal because he can see him in the summer only – Zoran spends the rest of the year with his mother in Sarajevo.

Production
Cast of the #JustSaying series was selected over a period of several months in Serbia, Montenegro, Bosnia and Herzegovina, Macedonia and Kosovo. In the very beginning, the creative team decided that the cast should consist of young actors and not of the non-professional actors, which was among their ideas and options initially.

This is the first significant project professionally for most of the people involved in the production of this series – from the very young actors to the director, Ms. Jelena Gavrilović, a senior undergraduate of Film Directing at the Faculty of Dramatic Arts in Belgrade. The series' supervisors were some of the key creative authors of the modern Serbian scene, including Boris Miljković, Đorđe Marković and Kosta Glušica, whose valuable experiences were used to direct the creative process. At the same time, they enjoyed the creative expression of the new generation of authors, and enabled them to create their own language and communicate their wishes, fears, aspirations and their reality to us.

The series was filmed on numerous locations in Belgrade, and in Sarajevo, Kotor, Prizren, Novi Sad, Ada Bojana and Srebrno Jezero as well.

Promotion
Popular Social networks' pages of #JustSaying series on Facebook, Twitter, YouTube, SoundCloud and Instagram provide an opportunity for the viewers to connect and communicate with the people involved in creation of the series and with other fans.

Each character in the series has their own profile page on Facebook, Twitter and Instagram networks, which are used to gradually reveal information about the characters – their musical, cinematographic and reading preferences and choices and things that make them happy. Through their interactions on the social networks' sites, the characters are becoming three-dimensional, richer and closer to the audience. Other than among themselves, the characters are also communicating with their audiences on the social networks' sites, providing the audience members with opportunities and channels to supply comments, like and share the posts that the #JustSaying characters are publishing for their online community on a daily basis.

Music
Thrilling soundtrack of the series ranges from the music by Voodoo Popeye to that produced by the Stray Dogg, from Vlado Georgijev's songs to Prti Bee Gee. Descriptions of each webisode contain titles of songs used in the series, and almost all the music used is available for listening on the official SoundCloud channel of the series.

Critical reception
During the initial 40 days of distribution, when the first ten webisodes were broadcast, the YouTube channel counted more than 150.000 views, and its Facebook page got almost 10,000 likes. In August 2014. YouTube channel reached 700.000 views.

The launch and broadcasting of the series were greeted by many media, too, and the quality of the series' production was additionally acclaimed by several awards and nominations. In February 2014 the series won the "Satellite" award in short form category; one month later the series was awarded at the LAWEBFEST u the following two categories: Director of photography and Lead actress; in April of the same year the series was proclaimed the official Webby honoree in category Online Film & Video, subcategory Drama: long form or series; same period saw the series awarded gold medal at the World media festival in Hamburg; bit later the series was nominated for the Rocky award at the B.A.N.F. World media festival; finally, at the Melbourne web fest the series entered the official selection.

Re:Generation
JustSaying web series is a segment of Re:Generation Project. Re:Generation (Re:Generacija) is an online facility and place for the young people from this region, aimed to facilitate their communication about themselves. At the same time, Re:Generation is a place for them to see and hear what other young people have to say, to meet their peers and to learn about their similarities and differences. This is where they can read, watch and hear about interesting initiatives from this region and internationally, and to share their ideas with the re:generation community in their creative efforts on providing solutions for local problems and in their creative social involvement.

Re:Generation is mainly available at official website of the series.

References

External links
Official website

2010s YouTube series
Drama web series
Comedy web series
2013 web series debuts